Branchiostomatidae is a family of lancelets belonging to the class Leptocardii, order unknown.

Genera:
 Asymmetron Andrews, 1893
 Branchiostoma Costa, 1834
 Epigonichthys Peters, 1876
 Epigonopterus Jordan & Gilbert, 1882
 †Palaeobranchiostoma Oelofsen & Loock, 1981

References

Cephalochordata